Sohan Singh Josh (1898–1982) was an Indian communist activist and freedom fighter.

Life
Josh was born on 12 November 1898 at village Chetanpura in Amritsar district, Punjab Province, British India. His father, Lal Singh, wished for his son to be educated but there was no school nearby, so Sohan Singh entered school rather late. He passed the Middle standard examination from Church Mission School, Majitha, and the Matriculation examination from D.A.V. School, Amritsar. For his tertiary education, Josh joined the Khalsa College, Amritsar, but had to leave soon after owing to financial difficulties.

Following his short tenure at Khalsa College, Josh went to Hubli in Bengal Presidency and later to Bombay where he worked up to 1918 in the Censor's office. He returned to Amritsar later to pursue a career as a school teacher.

In 1921, Josh took an active interest in the Akali movement for the liberation of gurdwaras from mahants. Josh zealously opposed the British Raj in India, and as a result of his anti-British activities was arrested. He was tried and sentenced to three years imprisonment. At that time he became the member of the Shiromani Gurudwara Parbandhak Committee and the Shiromani Akali Dal. Josh was a prolific writer. In 1925 he helped to bring out a revolutionary paper, Kirti, which was main vehicle for Bhagat Singh to propagate his ideas.

Josh was a leader both of the Kirti Kisan Party and the Naujawan Bharat Sabha, being one of several people who were prominent in both organisations simultaneously. He was imprisoned for his role in the Meerut Conspiracy Case,  was released in November 1933 and thereafter aligned himself with the Communist Party of India.

In 1943 he became the editor of a newly founded communist paper, Jang-i-Azadi.

References

Indian independence activists from Punjab (British India)
History of Punjab
People from Amritsar district
Revolutionary movement for Indian independence
1898 births
1982 deaths
Indian revolutionaries
Communist Party of India politicians from Punjab, India
Prisoners and detainees of British India